Quanbun Station, also known as Quanbum and Quanbun Downs, is a pastoral lease and cattle station located about  south west of Fitzroy Crossing in the Kimberley region of Western Australia.

The station was established at some time prior to 1887. In 1887 Edwin Rose and his brother became managers and part-owners of Quanbun. In 1894 the property was still managed by Rose, and was operating as a sheep station. 

The Calvert expedition arrived at the station in 1896 and immediately set up a search party for a group of men who were supposed to arrive ahead of the main party.

In 1905 the property was owned by A.J. Rose, who remained in the area until 1911.

Roses were managers at Quanbun in 1954 when SP Walker from United Aborigines Mission Station at Fitzroy Crossing visited.

The property was owned by Keith Anderson in 2010; Anderson also owned Jubilee Downs Station.

In 2020, Andrew Forrest acquired both Quanbun and Jubilee Downs for over 30 million.

See also
List of ranches and stations
List of pastoral leases in Western Australia

References

Homesteads in Western Australia
Pastoral leases in Western Australia
Kimberley (Western Australia)
Stations (Australian agriculture)